Good Luck Sakhi is a 2022 Indian Telugu-language sports comedy film written and directed by Nagesh Kukunoor. The film stars Keerthy Suresh, Aadhi Pinisetty and Jagapathi Babu. The plot follows Sakhi (Keerthy) who supposedly brings bad luck to everyone. After an army colonel moves to town and opens a sharpshooting centre, she begins to train as a shooter to participate at the national level.
The film was announced in April 2019 and marked Kukunoor's directorial debut in Telugu cinema. Devi Sri Prasad composed the music, with cinematography by Chirantan Das and editing by A. Sreekar Prasad. The film was shot in Hyderabad, Vikarabad and Pune, and was completed in September 2020.

Good Luck Sakhi was released theatrically on 28 January 2022, having been delayed multiple times due to the COVID-19 pandemic. The film opened to negative reviews from critics.

Plot

The story starts out with Sakhi or "Bad luck Sakhi" in a marriage proposal. While arriving the groom is injured as the horse stumbled. The scene is then continued by a song. We then see a normal villager, a shooting coach comes to visit her village where he decides to train some of them to represent the shooting squads. Sakhi is picked alongside Soori. Soori loots jewelry from the bus passengers using the gun from the coach and buys a new bike. Coach learns of all this and exiles him from the academy. Sakhi attends the shooting competition and refuses to participate after looking at the talented shooters. Coach encourages Sakhi and she goes on. Sakhi is caught using her lucky marbles which was given to her by Goli Raju in the childhood. Coach says that her concentration is more important than the superstitions. Sakhi again continues without the marbles and is qualified for the national level. Everyone in the village is proud of her. Goli Raju still misunderstands the love of Sakhi and the coach. 

The next day, it was Goli Raju's performance day and the most famous actor in the town had come to watch the play for selecting actors for his next Mayabazar remake. The coach and Sakhi also attends the play. Goli Raju, due to the effect of Sakhi's Bad luck, forgets the lines and disappointed goes to the green room. Sakhi pays him a visit and Goli Raju agrees that she has bad luck and unfriends her. Sakhi returns the marbles to Raju which was given by him in her childhood and leaves. 

The next day is Sakhi's national shooting competition. Disappointed due to the breaking up of her and Goli Raju, she loses her concentration in the competition and loses the aim. She then comes at the eighth place. In the green room (before the final round), Sakhi tells the coach does not want to participate in the finals because of her bad luck and there arises a fight between them. She then goes to participate and purposefully misses her aim. Meanwhile, the famous actor selects Raju for the remake of Mayabazar and realizes that Sakhi and the coach told that he was a talented actor. Goli Raju immediately rushes to Hyderabad along with the good luck marbles which Sakhi gave to him that day (which he gave to Sakhi in childhood). He reaches at the correct time and gives Sakhi the marbles. Sakhi remembers that in the last competition, her coach said that her concentration is important than the superstitions. She drops the marbles purposefully and shoots her aim, leading her to win gold. 

The plot then ends with the wedding of Sakhi and Goli Raju.

Cast 
 Keerthy Suresh as Sakhi Pawar
 Aadhi Pinisetty as Goli Raju, Sakhi's childhood friend and later husband
 Jagapathi Babu as Sakhi's coach
 Ramaprabha as Sakhi's grandmother, who is supportive of Sakhi
 Rahul Ramakrishna as Soori, who irritates all the girls in the village and also does illegal work 
 Raghu Babu
 Shravya
 Venugopal
 Gayatri Bhargavi
 Shweta Verma as Anjali, a talented shooter who wins gold in most of the shooting competitions, later defeated by Sakhi in the finals

Production 
Nagesh Kukunoor initially wrote the script for Hrishikesh Mukherjee. After fifteen years it became the director's debut Telugu film. Kukunoor wanted Keerthy Suresh after watching her in Mahanati. The film was officially announced on 27 April 2019. The title Good Luck Sakhi was unveiled in November 2019. Keerthy plays a rural girl from Andhra Pradesh who supposedly brings bad luck to everyone. Following the accidental death of her fiancé just before their wedding, she begins to train as a sharpshooter to participate at the national level.

The first schedule of filming started in April 2019 in Hyderabad. Filming took place in Vikarabad and Pune. Dil Raju joined the production team as presenter in July 2019. 75% of filming was completed by November 2019. After being suspended by the COVID-19 pandemic, filming was resumed in September 2020 and was completed in the same month.

Release 
Good Luck Sakhi is released theatrically on 28 January 2022. It was initially scheduled to be released theatrically on 3 June 2021, along with the dubbed versions of Tamil and Malayalam languages. However, the release was indefinitely postponed owing to the COVID-19 pandemic in India. After a while, the film release was scheduled for 19 and 26 November 2021 and also for 3, 10 and 31 December 2021.

Home media 
Post-theatrical digital streaming rights of the film were acquired by Amazon Prime Video. It will be premiered on 12 February 2022 in Telugu along with the dubbed versions in Tamil and Malayalam.

Reception 
The film opened to negative reviews from critics and audience. A reviewer from The Hans India wrote: "Good Luck Sakhi is a sports drama that lacks strong characterisations and a gripping presentation. Despite good performances from all the key characters, the dull and predictable proceedings make "Good Luck Sakhi" a disappointing watch. The New Indian Express rated 1.5 out on 5 and wrote Good Luck Sakhi also positions itself as a woman-empowerment message movie, even if this angle becomes secondary to everything else. The vagueness in the narration doesn't always drive home the message: 'There's no such thing like luck, you determine your own destiny.' So nothing much stays with us once you step out of the theatre. Writing for The Hindu, Sangeetha Devi Dundoo wrote that the story was "simplistic and predictable," and falls way short of being another Iqbal.

The Times of India critic Neeshita Nyayapati rated 2.5 out on 5 and wrote felt that Kukunoor's Telugu debut was a let down. "Good Luck Sakhi has a terrific opening that draws you in. Devi Sri Prasad's number Bad Luck Sakhi plays out almost like a musical on a Broadway show and you're intrigued. However, despite the composer, cinematographer Chiratan Das and the lead actors giving their best, the film's sound design and editing are also a let-down." A reviewer from Eenadu appreciated the performances but criticized the screenplay and lack of strong conflict.

References

External links 

Films shot in Hyderabad, India
Indian romantic comedy films
Indian sports comedy films
Film productions suspended due to the COVID-19 pandemic
Films postponed due to the COVID-19 pandemic
Films scored by Devi Sri Prasad
Films shot in Telangana
Films shot in Maharashtra
Films set in Telangana
2022 romantic comedy films
2020s sports comedy films
2020s Telugu-language films